A right-wing dictatorship, sometimes also referred to as a rightist dictatorship or right-wing authoritarianism, is an authoritarian or sometimes totalitarian regime following right-wing policies. Right-wing dictatorships are typically characterized by appeals to traditionalism, the protection of law and order and the advocacy of nationalism, and justify their rise to power based on a need to uphold a conservative status quo, often in opposition to communism. Notable examples of right-wing dictatorships include Nazi Germany, Fascist Italy, Estado Novo, Francoist Spain, and a number of military dictatorships that ruled various Latin American countries during the Cold War.

Characteristics of a right-wing dictatorship

Military dictatorship 

In the most common Western view, the perfect example of a right-wing dictatorship is any of those that once ruled in South America. Those regimes were predominantly military juntas and most of them collapsed in the 1980s. Communist countries, which were very cautious about not revealing their authoritarian methods of rule to the public, were usually led by civilian governments and officers taking power were not much welcomed there. Few exceptions include the Burmese Way to Socialism (Burma, 1966–1988), the Military Council of National Salvation (People's Republic of Poland, 1981–1983) or the North Korean regime's evolution throughout the rule of Kim Il-sung.

Religion and the government 

Many right-wing regimes kept strong ties with local clerical establishments. This policy of a strong Church-state alliance is often referred to as Clerical fascism. Pro-Catholic dictatorships included the Estado Novo (1933–1974) and the Federal State of Austria (1934–1938). There also exist clerical dictatorships in the Muslim world, including the Islamic Republic of Iran and the Islamic Emirate of Afghanistan. The theocratic absolute monarchies of Saudi Arabia or Vatican City also share many similarities with the regimes mentioned above. Many of those are/were led by spiritual leaders, such as the Slovak Republic under the Reverend Josef Tiso or Iran under the Ayatollahs Khomeini (1979–1989) and Khamenei (1989–present). Some right-wing dictatorships, like Nazi Germany, were even openly hostile to certain religions.

Right-wing dictatorships by region

Europe 

The existence of right-wing dictatorships in Europe are largely associated with the rise of fascism. The conditions created by World War I and its aftermath gave way both to revolutionary socialism and reactionary politics. Fascism arose as part of the reaction to the socialist movement, in attempt to recreate a perceived status quo ante bellum. Right-wing dictatorships in Europe were mostly destroyed with the Allied victory in World War II, although some continued to exist in Southern Europe until the 1970s.

List of European right-wing dictatorships

Asia 

Right-wing dictatorships in Asia emerged during the early 1930s, as military regimes seized power from local constitutional democracies. The phenomenon soon spread to other countries with the military occupations driven by the militarist expansion of the Empire of Japan. After the end of World War II, Asian right-wing dictatorships took on a decidedly anti-communist role in the Cold War, with many being backed by the United States.

List of Asian right-wing dictatorships

North, Central, and South America
Right-wing dictatorships largely emerged in Central America and the Caribbean during the early 20th century. Sometimes they arose in order to provide concessions to American corporations such as the United Fruit Company, forming regimes that have been described as "banana republics". North American right-wing dictatorships were instrumental in suppressing their countries' labour movements and instituting corporatist economies. During the Cold War, these right-wing dictatorships were characterized by a distinct anti-communist ideology, and often rose to power through US-backed coups.

List of North American right-wing dictatorships

See also 
 Films depicting Latin American military dictatorships
 List of political leaders who held active military ranks in office
 Military government
 Police state

References

Bibliography 

Anti-communism
Dictatorship
Right-wing politics